Bagpat district is one of the 75 districts of the Indian state of Uttar Pradesh with headquarters at the town of Baghpat.

History
Baghpat city, after which the district takes its name, derives its name either from vyagprastha ("land of tigers") or from vakyaprasth ("place for delivering speeches"). the city was finally named Baghpat, or Bagpat, during the Mughal era. Starting from a small commercial center known as the Mandi, the city grew in importance after the 1857 mutiny and became the headquarters of Baghpat tehsil.

Baghpat district was created in the year September 1997 and named after the erstwhile Baghpat tehsil of Meerut district.

Geography
Baghpat town lies on the east bank of the Yamuna River and is within the National Capital Region.

It borders Sonipat and Panipat districts of Haryana; Meerut, Muzaffarnagar, Shamli, and Ghaziabad districts of Uttar Pradesh; and the National Capital Territory of Delhi

Demographics

According to the 2011 census, Bagpat district has a population of 1,303,048, which is roughly equal to that of African nation of Mauritius or the US state of New Hampshire. This gives it a ranking of the 376th most populous districts in India (out of a total of 640). Its population growth rate over the decade 2001-2011 was 11.87%. Bagpat has a sex ratio of 858 females for every 1000 males, and a literacy rate of 73.54%. Scheduled Castes make up 11.44% of the population.

Baghpat is a Hindu-majority district, with about 70% Hindu population and 28% Muslim population. Jains make up over 1% of the population.

96.74% of the population of the district spoke Hindi, and 2.54% Urdu, as their first language.

Administration

Legislative constituencies
The current Member of the Legislative Assembly (MLA) of the Uttar Pradesh Vidhan Sabha for Baghpat is Yogesh Dhama; the MLA for Baraut is Krishan Pal Malik; and the MLA for Chhaprauli is [Ajay Kumar ]. All of these state-legislature constituencies are part of the Baghpat Lok Sabha constituency, whose MP is Satya Pal Singh.

Tehsils and blocks
Bagpat district is divided into 3 tehsils: Baghpat, Baraut, and Khekra. Baghpat tehsil comprises two blocks – Baghpat and Pilana; while Baraut comprises three – Binauli, Chhaprauli, and Baraut. Khekra tehsil comprises only the Khekra block. Baghpat, Baraut, Doghat Rural and Khekada are the major towns in the district.

Tehsils
Baghpat
Baraut
Khekra

Blocks
Baghpat
Baraut
Binauli
Chhaprauli
Khekra
Pilana

Economy
Baghpat town has an agriculture-based economy where sugarcane is a main crop. There are sugar mills in Baghpat, Ramala and Malakpur. Wheat, mustard, and vegetables are also extensively grown.

Education
Colleges located in Baghpat include:
 JagMohan Institute of Management and Technology
 Janta Vedic College

Notable people
 Nitin Tomar, professional Indian kabaddi player, native of Malakpur
 Satya Pal Malik, politician, serving as the 21st Governor of Meghalaya, born in Hisawada village

Villages
 

Mal Majra
Rathaura

References

External links

 
 Shri Parshvanath Jain Temple, Bada Gaon

 
Districts of Uttar Pradesh
Meerut division
Minority Concentrated Districts in India